The 1949 Honduran Amateur League was the third edition of the Honduran Amateur League.  C.D. Hibueras obtained its 1st national title.  The season ran from 10 April to 30 October 1949.

Regional champions

Known results

National championship round
Played in a single round-robin format in Tegucigalpa between the regional champions.  Also known as the Triangular.

Results

Hibueras's lineup

References

Liga Amateur de Honduras seasons
Honduras
1949 in Honduras